The 2022 Lory Meagher Cup is the 14th staging of the Lory Meagher Cup since its establishment by the Gaelic Athletic Association in 2009. The cup began on 10 April 2022 and is scheduled to end on 21/22 May 2022.

Louth won, the first team to win the Lory Meagher Cup on three occasions.

Competition Format

Cup format 
The 6 teams will play each other once in the Group Stage. The top 2 teams in the group will advance to the final.

Promotion 
The winner of the final will be promoted to the Nicky Rackard Cup.

Group stage

Group stage table

Monaghan were deducted 4 points for fielding an ineligible player. Games v Louth and Cavan were forfeited without award to opposition. From a scoring difference perspective only, it is treated as if the game never took place (i.e. no score for or against either team involved)

Louth are ranked ahead of Leitrim on head to head record. (Round 5: Louth bt. Leitrim)

Fixtures and results

Round 1

Monaghan forfeited game vs. Cavan due to fielding an ineligible player.

Round 2

Monaghan forfeited game vs. Louth due to fielding an ineligible player.

Round 3

Round 4

Round 5

Knockout stage

Final

 Louth are promoted to the 2023 Nicky Rackard Cup.

References 

Lory Meagher Cup
Lory Meagher Cup